Adrian Leigh Fenlon (born 1972 in Enniscorthy, County Wexford) is an Irish sportsperson.  He plays hurling with his local club Rapparees and was a member of the Wexford senior inter-county team in the 1990s and 2000s. Renowned for his physics-defying skill in taking sideline cuts.

References 

1972 births
Living people
Rapparees hurlers
Wexford inter-county hurlers
All-Ireland Senior Hurling Championship winners